Philips Records is a record label founded by the Dutch electronics company Philips and the Dutch-American largest record label company Universal Music Group. It was founded as Philips Phonographische Industrie in 1950. In 1946, Philips acquired the company which pressed records for British Decca's Dutch outlet in Amsterdam.

History
The record label originated as "Philips Phonographische Industrie" (PPI) in June 1950 when it began issuing classical music recordings. Recordings were also made of popular artists of multiple nationalities and of classical artists from Germany, France and the Netherlands. Launched under the slogan "Records of the Century" (referring to Philips Industries' UK Head Office at Century House, W1), the first releases in Britain appeared in January 1953 on 10" 78 rpm discs, with LPs appearing in July 1954.

Philips also distributed recordings made by the United States Columbia Records (which at the time was a unit of CBS) in the UK and on the European continent. After the separation of the English Columbia label (owned by EMI) and American Columbia, Philips also started distributing original Columbia recordings on the Philips label in the UK.

The first batch of eight singles releases in 1953 included British artists such as Gilbert Harding, Flanagan and Allen and Gracie Fields, followed by American Columbia recording artists Jo Stafford, Frankie Laine and Johnnie Ray. The first single on the label to chart was Frankie Laine's "I Believe", which reached the No. 1 chart position in the UK that April. Many of the first British recordings on the label were produced by Norman Newell until John Franz was appointed artists and repertoire (A&R) manager in 1954.

In 1958, Philips created a subsidiary label, Fontana Records, which meant that American-Columbia recordings were being issued on both the Philips and Fontana labels. This arrangement lasted until April 1962, when, under pressure from Columbia in America, Philips then created a third label for them, CBS Records (it could not name the label Columbia as the copyright for that name had long been owned by EMI). In late 1964, under the stewardship of U.S. President of Columbia Records Goddard Lieberson, CBS Records formed its own international operations, adopting the name of its then parent CBS. CBS Records set up their UK operation in Theobalds Road in Holborn. Singles and albums on the Philips and Fontana labels by Columbia-owned product were subsequently deleted from the catalogue.

In 1962, Philips Records and Deutsche Grammophon formed the Grammophon-Philips Group joint venture (GPG), which later became PolyGram in 1972. UK pressings were manufactured at the company's large factory based at Walthamstow in N.E. London.

In 1964, after Philips lost its US and Canadian distribution deal with Columbia Records, it entered an exchange agreement with Mercury Records. A year later, Philips' US affiliate Consolidated Electronics Industries Corp. (a.k.a. Conelco), bought Mercury and its subsidiary labels, such as Smash. Philips classical, jazz and pop records were now marketed by Mercury in the US under the Philips label. The Mercury Living Presence team also made classical recordings for Philips, in July 1961. These records, made in Walthamstow Town Hall near London, included Liszt piano concertos by Sviatoslav Richter and the London Symphony Orchestra conducted by Kiril Kondrashin; two albums of symphonic "bon-bons" by the London Symphony Orchestra and Charles Mackerras released as "Kaleidoscope"; "Russian Song Recital" by Galina Vishnevskaya and Mstislav Rostropovich; and Beethoven sonata op. 69 for cello and piano by Richter and Rostropovich. The Richter Liszt album was recorded on 3-track 35mm magnetic film and was reissued on CD from a remaster made from the film by original producer Wilma Cozart Fine, (wife of the recording engineer Bob) as part of the Philips Solo series.

Classical groups that Philips heavily recorded included the Royal Concertgebouw Orchestra, the Beaux Arts Trio, and the Quartetto Italiano. Violinist Arthur Grumiaux and the pianist Claudio Arrau were under contract to Philips. Symphony orchestras under contract, including the LSO, were under the command of prestigious young conductors such as Colin Davis and Bernard Haitink.

From 1961 until the late 1980s, Philips Records (USA) issued many classical titles in US-specific packaging, initially in the same glossy-laminated covers as Mercury Records. The records were pressed at Mercury's plant in Richmond, Indiana, and mastered in New York by George Piros at Fine Recording, using 2-track and mono master tapes provided by Philips. These releases were the PHS 900 xxx series for stereo and the 500 xxx series for mono. Clair Van Ausdal in Mercury's New York office oversaw the Philips classical US releases through the mid-1960s.

Philips also launched an eponymous jazz label in the US, releasing both imported European Philips recordings and making new American recordings of Gerry Mulligan, Dizzy Gillespie and Woody Herman, among others. These records were made through Mercury's existing jazz operations and produced by Jack Tracy and others.

In addition to jazz and classical music, Philips also became a major label in the world of rock and pop music in the late 1950s until late 1970s. In the UK, Philips developed a strong popular music roster, signing acts like Marty Wilde, Roy Castle, Anne Shelton, the Four Pennies, Dusty Springfield, and the Walker Brothers. The American pop label was launched in 1962 starting with the R&B single "Gee Baby" by Ben & Bea and showed a comfortability with folk-country, releasing "Makes You Wanna Sigh" by Ross Legacy in 1969. It signed the Four Seasons in 1964. It also played a major part in promoting the garage rock genre and the psychedelic rock genre in the mid to late 60s, their most successful signing being Blue Cheer.

In the UK during the 1960s and 1970s, Philips turned its attention more to the growing MOR market with artists like Lena Zavaroni, Peters and Lee, Nana Mouskouri and Demis Roussos, as well as issuing novelty records by media personalities like Ed Stewart, Bruce Forsyth, Dave Allen and Chris Hill. In 1970, Philips, Fontana, Mercury Records, and the newly formed Vertigo Records were amalgamated into a new company called Phonogram. In Europe, however, Philips was used on a major basis and it became the outlet for Sire Records in America and distributed a number of punk and new wave bands like Talking Heads, the Ramones, and Radio Birdman, who were signed from Australia. It also released some disco records by Donna Summer and the Village People, as their home label Casablanca Records was not cleared for use in all countries around the world. Another important American label signing for the UK was Avco Records, which provided Phonogram with one of their best-selling U.S. acts, the Stylistics. By late 1979 Phonogram signed Dire Straits to the Vertigo label. The band sold huge numbers of records all over Europe and were chosen to promote the initial release of CDs in 1985, with a nationwide road tour in association with Philips/Sony Industries.

By 1980, PolyGram consolidated all of its U.S. operations, Phonogram, Inc. Mercury Records, RSO, Casablanca and Polydor Records and associated labels into PolyGram Records and it was based in New York City. Under the new company, PolyGram decided to discontinue Philips as a pop and rock label in the UK and throughout much of Europe, though it still frequently issued records in France and South East Asia by Chinese and Hong Kong pop artists. The majority of PolyGram's rock and pop music signings went to Mercury, and Polydor in the UK and Europe, though the label was used sparingly in America. Philips became part of PolyGram Classics as a classical music label along with Decca Records and Deutsche Grammophon. Most artists were moved to Mercury Records or other local PolyGram-owned labels.

From the early 1970s, Philips classical records were no longer being produced in the US; rather they were made in the Netherlands and sold as imports in the American market. Philips reissued a group of Mercury Living Presence titles as "Mercury Golden Imports", with manufacture in the Netherlands and masters cut from 2-track production tapes, as opposed to the original-issue method of mixing stereo LPs directly from the edited 3-track master tapes and films.

In the 1980s, Philips Classics Records was formed to distribute its classical artists, although classical recordings have also been issued on the regular Philips label. In the US, Philips eventually handled distribution and sales for Philips, Mercury, British Decca (sold under the London label in the US) and Deutsche Grammophon.

After the sale of PolyGram to Vivendi/Seagram, all PolyGram-labels - including Philips and Decca - became part of the Universal Music Group. The Philips UK and Phonogram UK websites are with WIX.

Compact disc era
In 1983, Philips became one of the first record labels to issue compact discs using digital recordings that had been made since 1978.

Philips and its subsidiaries eventually re-issued many of its pre-digital stereo and mono recordings on compact disc. Philips and DuPont partnered in four CD manufacturing plants in Hanover, Germany; Blackburn in the UK (formerly the Philips Laservision Disc factory); Kings Mountain in North Carolina, and Louviers in France. By the mid-1990s, PolyGram Classics handled the classical labels (Philips, Mercury, Decca, Deutsche Grammophon) and Verve Music Group handled the jazz back catalogue (from Verve, Mercury, etc.) and new jazz releases. Island Records absorbed Mercury in 2014 and in doing so, Island has continued to manage the Philips pop back catalogue to this day.

Philips Records has been part of Universal Music since 1998, the name continuing to be licensed from the label's former parent company. In 1999, Philips Classics was absorbed into the Decca Music Group, and Philips recording and mastering operations in the Netherlands were shut down. Former employees bought the Philips Recording Center in Baarn, Netherlands, and formed Polyhymnia International (a recording and mastering company) and Pentatone Records (which specializes in SACD releases).

Many of the Philips classical recordings have been reissued on the Eloquence label. Universal also released a "Philips 50" series marking the 50th anniversary of Philips Records in the early 2000s; some of those CDs are still in print. Pentatone has released Philips Quadraphonic sound recordings from the early and mid-1970s in 4-channel SACD format, as their RQR Series.

Philips' classical catalog was issued on CD under the headings Digital Classics, Legendary Classics and Silver Line Classics. Many of these titles have been reissued on the Decca label.

Releases

Connoisseur Collection
The "Philips Connoisseur Collection" issued world music and other genres.

PCC–603: Soeur Sourire – The Singing Nun
PCC–606: Missa Luba (a version of the Latin Mass based on traditional Congolese songs)
PCC–611: Les Soeurs Blanches Of Katana – Missa Bantu
PCC–616: Michel Legrand – The Umbrellas of Cherbourg (Les Parapluies De Cherbourg)
PCC–619: Los Fronterizos Chorus and Orchestra – Misa Criolla
PCC–608: Edith Piaf – Adieu, Little Sparrow
PCC–620: Jacques Brel: The Poetic World of Jacques Brel
PCC–621: Sarah Gorby – Songs of the Ghetto
PCC–623: Various – Misa Flamenca · Misa Mozarabe
PCC–633: Yves Montand – Extraordinaire!
PCC–634: Jacques Brel: If you go away

Popular music artists
 ABBA - Sweden
 Sabrina Carpenter - United States
 Alessia Cara - Canada
 Carly Rae Jepsen - Canada
 Billie Eilish - United States
 Lady Gaga - United States
 Selena Gomez - United States
 Ellie Goulding - United Kingdom
 Ariana Grande - United States
 Halsey - United States
 Sofia Carson - United States
 Jessie J - United Kingdom
 Demi Lovato - United States
 Mabel - United Kingdom
 Julia Michaels - United States
 Nicki Minaj - Trinidad and Tobago and United States
 Olivia Newton-John - Australia and United Kingdom
 Lana Del Rey - United States
 Olivia Rodrigo - United States
 Hailee Steinfeld - United States
 Taylor Swift - United States
 David Bowie – David Bowie (Space Oddity) (1969)
 Lucifer's Friend - Germany/UK (1970)
 Alan Stivell - Renaissance de la Harpe Celtique (1972)
 John R. Cash - U.S.
Ziva Magnolya - Southeast Asia
Lyodra Ginting - Southeast Asia
Tiara Andini - Southeast Asia
Jackie Cheung (張學友) - British Hong Kong (1985-now)
Leon Lai (黎明) - British Hong Kong (1990-1997)
Andy Lau (劉德華) - British Hong Kong (1985-1992 and 1995-1997)
Lee Mao-shan (李茂山) - Taiwan (1991-1999 and 2006-now)
Kamahl - Australia
Galapagos Duck – Australia
Radio Birdman – Australia – European release only
Mr. George – Australia
Hush – Australia (debut single release only)
Silver Studs – Australia
Demis Roussos – Greece
Nana Mouskouri – Greece
Guys 'n' Dolls – England
The Missing Links – Australia
Janice Slater – Australia
Elton John (US singles from 1968 to 1970)
Mud – England (1969, but also on Philips in Europe from 1975 to 1977)
Thunderthighs – England
5,000 Volts – England
Lena Zavaroni – Scotland
Madeline Bell – Newark, New Jersey
Jorge Ben - Brazil
Maria Bethânia – Brazil
Blue Cheer – San Francisco, California, U.S.
Blue Mink – England
Teresa Brewer – Toledo, Ohio, U.S.
Chico Buarque – Brazil
Cluster – Berlin, Germany
Ray Conniff (licensed from U.S. Columbia Records)
Gal Costa – Brazil
Teresa De Sio – Cava de' Tirreni, Italy
Val Doonican – Ireland
Ekseption – Netherlands
Eloy (debut album only)
The Four Pennies – various, England
The Four Seasons – Newark, New Jersey, U.S.
Frumpy – Hamburg, Germany 
Gong – France 
Jacques Brel – Belgium 
Johnny Hallyday – Paris, France (from 1961 until 2005)
Coco Briaval – Paris, France (1966)
Wes Harrison –
H.P. Lovecraft – Chicago, U.S.
Bobby Hebb – Nashville, Tennessee, U.S.
Johnny Horton – (licensed from U.S. Columbia Records)
Brian Hyland – Queens, New York, U.S.
Jim and Jean – New York City, U.S. (1965)
Billy Joel – New York, U.S
Yoshie Kasiwabara – Japan
The Kaye Sisters – England
Kraftwerk – Düsseldorf, Germany
Frankie Laine (licensed from US Columbia Records)
Vicky Leandros – Greece/Germany
Los Paraguayos – Paraguay
Luv' – Netherlands
Harvey Mandel – Detroit, Michigan, U.S.
Manfred Mann's Earth Band – European release only
Susan Maughan – Consett, County Durham
Paul Mauriat – Marseille, France
Roger Miller – Nashville, Tennessee, U.S.
Guy Mitchell (licensed from US Columbia)
Mouth & MacNeal – Netherlands
Osamu Minagawa – Japan
New Vaudeville Band – England
Peters and Lee – England
Ajda Pekkan – Turkey
Johnnie Ray (licensed from US Columbia)
Richard and the Young Lions – Newark, New Jersey, U.S.
Raul Seixas – Brazil
Serendipity Singers – Boulder, Colorado, U.S.
Nina Simone – Tryon, North Carolina, U.S.
The Singing Nun – Fichermont, Belgium
Sir Douglas Quintet – San Antonio, Texas, U.S.
Dusty Springfield – West Hampstead, London
The Springfields – London
The Swingle Singers – Paris, France
Wally Tax – Amsterdam, Netherlands
The Tempters – Japan
T.O.P - Norway
Luigi Tenco – 21 March 1938, Cassine, Alessandria – 27 January 1967, Sanremo, Imperia, Italy
Frankie Vaughan – Liverpool, England
Caetano Veloso – Brazil
The Walker Brothers – Los Angeles, California, U.S.; based in London from Feb. 1965
John Walker – New York, U.S.
Scott Walker – Hamilton, Ohio, U.S.
David Whitfield – England
Headwind – Malaysia
Marty Wilde – Greenwich, South London
Terry Wogan – Limerick, Éire
Paco de Lucía – Algeciras, Spain

References

External links
 Philips Records
 https://philipsrecords.wixsite.com/history
 Official Decca & Philips Classics Website
 A discography of American Philips pop albums in the 1960s and early 1970s
 A discography of American Philips singles in the 1960s and early 1970s

Dutch record labels
Jazz record labels
Philips
Record labels established in 1950
Dutch companies established in 1950
Labels distributed by Universal Music Group